Ceroplesis quinquefasciata is a species of beetle in the family Cerambycidae. It was described by Johan Christian Fabricius in 1792. It is known from Angola, the Democratic Republic of the Congo, the Central African Republic, Cameroon, the Republic of the Congo, Equatorial Guinea, Ethiopia, Saudi Arabia, South Africa, Senegal, Togo, Tanzania, Zambia, and Uganda.

Subspecies
 Ceroplesis quinquefasciata atropos Fairmaire, 1882
 Ceroplesis quinquefasciata quinquefasciata (Fabricius, 1792)

References

quinquefasciata
Beetles described in 1792